Canute is a town in Washita County, Oklahoma, United States. The population was 541 at the 2010 census.

History
Canute was established in the early 1900s and located on the now-defunct Rock Island Railroad. Following the advent of the automobile, Canute became a popular stop along U.S. Route 66 and a large number of tourist businesses were established, including gasoline service stations, motels and restaurants. However, when Interstate 40 bypassed the small village to the north in May 1970 and received only one exit from the freeway, the local economy went into a decline due to the bypass and the concurrent closure of nearby Clinton-Sherman Air Force Base at Burns Flat, leading most of those businesses to shut down. Today, Canute businesses include a bank and auto repair shop on Route 66, along with a gas station/convenience store. Former Oklahoma governor David Walters was born in Canute.

Geography

Climate

Demographics

As of the census of 2000, there were 524 people, 214 households, and 145 families residing in the town. The racial makeup of the town was 88.36% White, 0.57% African American, 1.91% Native American, 0.19% Asian, 7.25% from other races, and 1.72% from two or more races. Hispanic or Latino of any race were 7.63% of the population.

There were 214 households, out of which 29.4% had children under the age of 18 living with them, 54.7% were married couples living together, 9.3% had a female householder with no husband present, and 31.8% were non-families. 28.0% of all households were made up of individuals, and 14.5% had someone living alone who was 65 years of age or older. The average household size was 2.45 and the average family size was 3.01.

In the town, the population was spread out, with 24.2% under the age of 18, 12.2% from 18 to 24, 25.4% from 25 to 44, 21.0% from 45 to 64, and 17.2% who were 65 years of age or older. The median age was 38 years. For every 100 females, there were 97.7 males. For every 100 females age 18 and over, there were 90.0 males.

The median income for a household in the town was $32,321, and the median income for a family was $38,036. Males had a median income of $26,406 versus $15,500 for females. The per capita income for the town was $20,283. About 13.7% of families and 15.6% of the population were below the poverty line, including 16.7% of those under age 18 and 22.5% of those age 65 or over.

Canute Public Schools

Canute Elementary School is located at Third and Walk Street. The elementary serves students in Pre-K through 6th grade with an average 32 students per class.

Canute Junior High and High School is located at 506 Third Street. The junior high is serves students in 7th through 9th grades with 34 students per class on average. The high school serves students in 10th grade through 12th grade with an average 30 students per class.

References

External links
 Encyclopedia of Oklahoma History and Culture - Canute

Towns in Oklahoma
Towns in Washita County, Oklahoma